Papatoetoe is a suburb in Auckland, New Zealand. It is the largest suburb in Auckland by population and is located to the northwest of Manukau Central, and 18 kilometres southeast of Auckland CBD. Papatoetoe has the unofficial title of Auckland's Little India, with 40 percent of the suburb's population being of Indian ethnicity according to the 2018 census.

Papatoetoe is a Māori name, which can be loosely translated as 'undulating area where the toetoe is the predominant feature', making it named after the 'Prince of Wales' feather' (or toetoe / toi toi), which grew abundantly in the swampy parts of the region. Owing to some confusion over the spelling, the area was known as Papatoitoi for many years. Papatoetoe is the only suburb in South Auckland where Maori/Pacific Islanders do not form the majority of the suburb's population. Papatoetoe is one of the most rapidly gentrifying suburbs in Auckland.

History

Early history
People have lived in the Papatoetoe area for almost the entire time of human settlement in New Zealand. For both the original Māori and the first English settlers, the Papatoetoe area was handily near the narrowest points between Auckland's two great harbours, where waka could be ported over land. It was also rich in fertile soil.

Inlets run from Papatoetoe eastward to the Waitematā Harbour and westward to the Manukau Harbour. Thus for travellers past and present the routes south to the Waikato River and the north to the Auckland isthmus – Tamaki-makau-rau (Tamaki coveted by many) – have always been through Papatoetoe.

History since World War II
The area's main population growth occurred after World War II, when many returning service men received housing in the area. By 1980, population growth had mostly ceased and remained stagnant throughout the 1990s and early 2000s, however a significant increase in population occurred after 2006 due to high rates of immigration and changes to the Auckland Unitary Plan allowing more intensive infill housing on large sections.

Papatoetoe Historical Society

Papatoetoe Historical Society was established in 1988 with the aim to gather the historical artifacts and information from the Papatoetoe district. The collection held includes a collation of information on Local Body members, schools as they developed, the origin and meaning of street names, women of the district (book available), people of the surrounding farming district, newspaper cuttings and information on local organisations. The society has also developed an archive collection which includes photographs, books, booklets, plans and posters. These collections can be viewed at the Papatoetoe Historical Society museum, currently being set up at the Papatoetoe Chambers, 35 St George St, Papatoetoe following its relocation from The Depot .
 
In 2012, Papatoetoe celebrated 150 years of civic life. The Papatoetoe 150 was initiated by the Papatoetoe Historical society to increase awareness of history and promote community organisations.

Local government
Papatoetoe Borough Council was established in 1946, and was succeeded by the Papatoetoe City Council in 1965. In 1989, it amalgamated with other local councils to form Manukau City Council, which eventually was subsumed by Auckland Council in November 2010.

The old Papatoetoe City Council building is at 91 Cambridge Terrace, Papatoetoe.

List of mayors

Demographics 

Papatoetoe had a population of 43,599 at the 2018 New Zealand census, an increase of 5,361 people (14.0%) since the 2013 census, and an increase of 9,411 people (27.5%) since the 2006 census. There were 11,469 households, comprising 22,248 males and 21,354 females, giving a sex ratio of 1.04 males per female, with 9,288 people (21.3%) aged under 15 years, 12,051 (27.6%) aged 15 to 29, 18,405 (42.2%) aged 30 to 64, and 3,852 (8.8%) aged 65 or older.

Ethnicities were 19.8% European/Pākehā, 12.7% Māori, 29.1% Pacific peoples, 50.1% Asian, and 2.1% other ethnicities. People may identify with more than one ethnicity.

The percentage of people born overseas was 51.6, compared with 27.1% nationally.

Although some people chose not to answer the census's question about religious affiliation, 17.9% had no religion, 36.4% were Christian, 1.3% had Māori religious beliefs, 18.2% were Hindu, 6.4% were Muslim, 2.3% were Buddhist and 12.5% had other religions.

Of those at least 15 years old, 6,060 (17.7%) people had a bachelor's or higher degree, and 6,120 (17.8%) people had no formal qualifications. 2,910 people (8.5%) earned over $70,000 compared to 17.2% nationally. The employment status of those at least 15 was that 17,913 (52.2%) people were employed full-time, 4,278 (12.5%) were part-time, and 1,593 (4.6%) were unemployed.

Economy

Papatoetoe Town Centre

In early 2009 planning began to revitalise the town centre in the St. George Street area. The plan envisaged new apartment buildings and nearby sports facilities bringing more business to the area, which had struggled due to competition from shopping malls.

Hunter's Corner
Hunter's Corner has become a popular shopping area for shoppers of Indian origin. Hunter's Corner accounts for 60 retail outlets of which about 40 have some form of Indian flavour.

Hunter's Corner used to be a notorious area for prostitution in the early 2000s due to it being relatively safer compared to similar town centres in South Auckland, however prostitution has largely disappeared in recent times after strong opposition from local residents.

Hunters Plaza

The Hunters Plaza shopping mall opened in 1991 and was upgraded in 2015. It features 47 stores, including Kmart and Countdown.

Transport 

Papatoetoe contains two train stations within the suburban limits. These include the Papatoetoe railway station situated in Old Papatoetoe and nearby Puhinui railway station situated in Puhinui Road. Both the Eastern Line and the Southern Line services both train stations. During peak times there is a train approximately every 5 minutes heading towards Britomart. It takes approximately 30 minutes from Papatoetoe railway station into Britomart. The Puhinui Station Interchange was upgraded in July 2021 to provide a rapid transit network to Auckland Airport, as well as forming a connection with Manukau. It takes approximately 10–12 minutes from Puhinui Station to Auckland Airport.

Auckland Southern Motorway and Southwestern Motorway connect Papatoetoe with Auckland City and Manukau. Southwestern Motorway interchanges are on Puhinui Road to the south and Massey Road in Māngere East to the north. The Southern Motorway interchange is on East Tamaki Road.

Sports

Association football
Papatoetoe is home to Papatoetoe AFC who compete in the Lotto Sport Italia NRFL Division 1A.
Papatoetoe is home to Papatoetoe United who play from the sports complex on Great South Road and are affiliated with Auckland Football Federation.

Cricket
Papatoetoe is home to the Papatoetoe Cricket Club who play in the Auckland Cricket Championship.

Golf

Rugby league
Papatoetoe is home to the Papatoetoe Panthers who are affiliated with the Auckland Rugby League.

Rugby union
Papatoetoe Rugby Football Club was established in 1946 and plays home matches at the Papatoetoe Sport Complex on Great South Road.

Tennis
Papatoetoe is home to two tennis clubs, Papatoetoe Tennis Club located at Papatoetoe Sports Complex and Sunnyside Tennis Club located in the Sunnyside Domain. Both clubs are affiliated to Auckland Tennis. Sunnyside Tennis Club was formed originally as Puhunui Tennis Club in 1955.

Education

Primary education
Papatoetoe has five primary schools in its zone:
Holy Cross School is a Catholic full primary school (years 1–8) integrated with the state system.
Founded in 1857, the school moved to its current site in 1872.
Papatoetoe East School is a state contributing primary school (years 1–6).
Papatoetoe South School is a state contributing primary school (years 1–6).
Papatoetoe West School is a state contributing primary school (years 1–6) which opened in 1949.

In addition, Papatoetoe North School, Puhinui School and South Auckland Seventh-day Adventist School could be considered to be in Papatoetoe.

Papatoetoe has one intermediate school: 

Kedgley Intermediate is on the boundary of the Papatoetoe area.

Secondary education
Papatoetoe has two secondary schools:

All these schools are coeducational. Rolls are as of

Notable people
Douglas Al-Bazi, refugee from Iraq
Len Brown - Former Mayor of Auckland
Barry Crump – Author, poet
David Dallas – Hip Hop Artist
Dillon Boucher - NZ Basketball Player, lived in Papatoetoe and went to Papatoetoe High School
Ricki Herbert – Soccer player – Played National Level for the All Whites and is their current coach. Also played for New Zealand in Soccer World Cup Finals 1982
Phil Goff – Mayor of Auckland, Former Labour Party Leader, Foreign and Defence Minister, lived in Papatoetoe and attended Papatoetoe High School
 Mike King - Mental Health Advocate
Kyle Jamieson - NZ Cricketer,  lived in Papatoetoe 
Keven Mealamu - Former All Black. Lived in Papatoetoe and attended Aorere College
Trevor Meale – Cricketer
David Shearer - Former Labour Party Leader,  lived in Papatoetoe and attended Papatoetoe High School
Ish Sodhi - NZ Cricketer,  lived in Papatoetoe and attended Papatoetoe High School
Tyree Tautogia – Part of highly successful rap group Smashproof
Gary Troup – Played club cricket in Papatoetoe going on to represent New Zealand 1976 – 1986
Heather Matthews (née Thompson) – Silver Medalist 1978 Commonwealth Games (3000 m). MBE – Services To Sport, Papatoetoe Sports Person of the Year.
Dei Hamo - Musician, attended Aorere College, referenced Papatoe in his top charting track We Gon' Ride.

Attractions

Murals in Old Papatoetoe
"Picnic Scene" by Ron van Dam (near Wallace Road corner)
"Papatoetoe General Store" by Christine Trout (Papatoetoe Mall)
"Bottle O" by Christine Trout (Papatoetoe Mall)
"Cameos" by Claudia Pond-Eyley (near Town Hall)
"Old Papatoetoe Logo" by Ron van Dam (near Shirley Road)
"St George St – 1930" by Merv Appleton (Rangitoto Road)
Historical cemeteries at Manukau Memorial Gardens and St John's Presbyterian Church.
Historic landmarks including
Old Railway Station
Cambria House and associated historic gardens (Puhinui Road)
Old Children's home (now in Wyllie Road)

References

Papatoetoe municipalities' publications
Papatoetoe City Council Statement of Objectives for Second District Scheme Review, 1981
Smytheman, Ivy F. and Tonson, Albert E. (1962). Our first hundred years: an historical record of Papatoetoe
Books
Auckland Provincial Handbook 1925–1926
Davidson, Janet (1984). The PreHistory of New Zealand, Auckland: Longman Paul.
Gadd, Bernard (1987). The City of Toetoe – A History of Papatoetoe, Auckland: The Dunmore Press,  (pbk.).
New Zealand Yearbooks (1906 ff.). Wellington: Government Printer.
 Kalous, Milan (1984) A small town in New Zealand: a short history of Papatoetoe. Commissioned by the Papatoetoe City Council.   Available at Research South (Manukau Library).
Oliver, William Hosking and Williams Bridget R. (eds) (1981). The Oxford History of New Zealand. Wellington: Oxford University Press.
Scholefield, G.H. (1940). A Dictionary of New Zealand Biography, Wellington: Government Printer.
Sedal, Venia Iris (1982). A Brief History of Otahuhu, Otahuhu Borough Council.
Searle, Ernest Johns (1981). City of Volcanoes, a Geology of Auckland, Auckland: Longman Paul.
Tonson, Albert E. (1966). Old Manukau, Auckland: Tonson.
Williams, Herbert William (1971). A Dictionary of the Maori Language, Wellington: Government Printer.
Booklets, pamphlets and reports
A Century of Witness, St John's Church Papatoetoe, 1854–1954
Kiwanis Club of Papatoetoe, New Zealand District, 1971–81
Lawlor, I. (1981). Puhinui Excavation Report, University of Auckland
Papatoetoe and District R.S.A. Annual Reports.
Papatoetoe Association Football Club Inc, Silver Jubilee 1959–1984
Papatoetoe Central School, Jubilee Commemorative Magazine 1857–1952 (1982), Auckland: Woodward Publications.
Papatoetoe District School Reunion, 106th Anniversary, 1962.
Papatoetoe District Cricket Club 1906–2006
Papatoetoe Fire Brigade 1928–1979
Papatoetoe Methodist Church, Jubilee Souvenir, 1912–1962
Simmons, D., (1980). The Creation Myth and the Origin of Auckland's Volcanoes, Auckland Institute and Museum.
Sims, A. (1983). History of the Papatoetoe Light Opera Club.
Sullivan, A. (1973). A site survey of lower Pukaki Creek, University of Auckland.
Sullivan, A. (1975). Checklist of archaeological sites at Crater Hill, Papatoetoe, Paper no 37, Anthropology Department, University of Auckland.
Newspapers
The Courier newspapers
Papatoetoe Gazette
Papatoetoe Independent
Papatoetoe News

External links
Auckland Council
Photographs of Papatoetoe held in Auckland Libraries' heritage collections.

Ōtara-Papatoetoe Local Board Area
Suburbs of Auckland
Red-light districts in New Zealand
Populated places on the Tāmaki River